Katlehong is a large township in the Gauteng Province of South Africa. It is 28 km south-east of Johannesburg and south of Germiston between two other townships of Thokoza and Vosloorus next to the N3 highway. It forms part of the City of Ekurhuleni Metropolitan Municipality.

Notable people 
Katlehong is home and gave birth to some of the South Africa's celebrated personalities and sports players, notably:
 Sibusiso Khumalo, professional soccer player
 Kwesta, rapper
 Nkosinathi Ngema, footballer 
 Emmanuel Ngobese, professional soccer player
 Reason, rapper
 Nthati Moshesh, actress
 Lindokuhle Sobekwa, documentary photographer

See also
Huntersfield Stadium
Tembisa
Alrode

References

External links 
 Township Vibes Taking The Townships To Another Level
 South Africa Today A YouTube Channel giving news updates on SA's high crime situation for tourists, business and media.
 Katlehong Resource Centre

Germiston
Townships in Gauteng
Populated places in Ekurhuleni
Populated places established in 1945